Gary Sutton (born 27 March 1955) is a cycling coach and a former professional racing cyclist. In 1980, Sutton became the amateur World Champion in the Points Race.

Sutton was born in Moree, New South Wales. He competed at the 1976 Summer Olympics and the 1980 Summer Olympics. He was one of the four men to win gold in the team pursuit for Australia at the 1978 Commonwealth Games along with his brother, Shane Sutton, who has worked as National Technical Director for British Cycling. Gary is also the father of Christopher Sutton, a professional racing cyclist.

After retiring from competition, Sutton became a coach, spending 26 years as a national coach with Cycling Australia. In May 2017, it was announced that Cycling Australia would not renew the contract for his position as women's endurance coach beyond the end of June. In August of the same year, USA Cycling announced that Sutton had been appointed as their track endurance head coach.

Sutton partnered Hugh Porter as the BBC's commentary team for the cycling events at the 2008 Summer Olympics in Beijing.

Palmarès

1974
2nd  Team Pursuit, Commonwealth Games
3nd  Pursuit, Commonwealth Games

1978
1st  Team Pursuit Commonwealth Games (with Colin Fitzgerald, Kevin Nichols and Shane Sutton)

1980
1st Prologue, GP Wilhelm Tell
1st  Amateur Points Race 1980 Track Cycling World Championships

1982
8th Ronde van Midden-Zeeland
1st and fastest time Goulburn to Sydney Classic

1983
1st Bendigo International Madison with Shane Sutton

1984
1st Herald Sun Tour
1st Stage 3, Herald Sun Tour
1st Stage 6, Herald Sun Tour
1st Stage 9, Herald Sun Tour
1st Stage 18, Herald Sun Tour
1st Stage 3, Yorkshire Classic (Harrogate)
1st Whitby
4th Newport, East Riding of Yorkshire
5th Yorkshire Classic (Harrogate)

1990
9th Herald Sun Tour
1st Stage 14, Herald Sun Tour

References

External links
 
 

1955 births
Living people
Australian cycling coaches
Australian male cyclists
Cyclists at the 1974 British Commonwealth Games
Cyclists at the 1978 Commonwealth Games
Commonwealth Games gold medallists for Australia
Cycling announcers
Cyclists from New South Wales
New South Wales Institute of Sport alumni
Commonwealth Games bronze medallists for Australia
Olympic cyclists of Australia
Cyclists at the 1976 Summer Olympics
Cyclists at the 1980 Summer Olympics
Commonwealth Games medallists in cycling
Australian track cyclists
Medallists at the 1974 British Commonwealth Games
Medallists at the 1978 Commonwealth Games